Sonny with a Chance is an American sitcom created by Steve Marmel for Disney Channel Original Series. It aired from February 8, 2009 to January 2, 2011.

The series revolves around Sonny Munroe (Demi Lovato), a teenage comedian who wins the chance of starring in the fictional children's sketch comedy series, So Random!. She is assisted by fellow cast members and new friends Tawni Hart (Tiffany Thornton), Nico Harris (Brandon Mychal Smith), Grady Mitchell (Doug Brochu) and Zora Lancaster (Allisyn Ashley Arm), along with Chad Dylan Cooper (Sterling Knight), the star of Mackenzie Falls, the rival tween TV show of So Random!.

Series overview

Episodes

Season 1 (2009)

Season 2 (2010–11)

See also
So Random!
 List of So Random! episodes

References

External links
 List of Sonny With a Chance episodes at Zap2it.com

Episodes
Sonny
Sonny
Sonny

it:Sonny tra le stelle#Episodi